Metropia is a 2009 English-language adult animated science fiction film directed by Tarik Saleh. The screenplay was written by Fredrik Edin, Stig Larsson, and Tarik Saleh after a story by Tarik Saleh, Fredrik Edin and Martin Hultman. The film uses a technique where photographs have been altered and heavily stylized in a computer program, and then animated. The visual style is inspired by the works of Terry Gilliam, Roy Andersson and Yuri Norstein.

Metropia was co-produced by Atmo Media Network and Lars von Trier's Danish production company Zentropa Entertainments, premiered at the 66th Venice International Film Festival, and opened in Sweden on 27 November 2009.

Plot
In a future Europe the world is running out of oil. A gigantic underground network is created by joining all the undergrounds together beneath Europe. Roger (Vincent Gallo), from a suburb of Stockholm, avoids the underground because he finds it disturbing. Sometimes when he is too near the underground he hears a strange voice in his head. One day Roger stumbles upon the truth that his life is controlled in every detail. Trexx, the company that runs the mammoth European rail network, has found a way to read and control minds using the dandruff shampoo "Dangst", with the goal of creating a  highly efficient advertising system. In order to break free, Roger joins forces with super-model Nina (Juliette Lewis), the former model and spokeswoman for Dangst.

Cast
 Vincent Gallo as Roger
 Juliette Lewis as Nina
 Udo Kier as Ivan Bahn
 Stellan Skarsgård as Ralph Parker
 Alexander Skarsgård as Stefan
 Sofia Helin as Anna
 Shanti Roney as Karl
 Fares Fares as Firaz
 Joanna Zofia Bard Mikolajczyk as metro voice
 Goran Marjanovic as asylum seeker
 Magnus Skogberg Tear as Roger's boss
 Lotta Bromé as news anchor
 Annelie Persson as Trexx Commercial
 Indiana Neidell as Wayne Marshal

Production
The story and supporting material were developed by Stockholm-based Atmo during a period of four years before the actual animation work had begun. Co-producers include Denmark's Zentropa and Norway's Tordenfilm, and with support from the Council of Europe's film fund Eurimages, the film had a budget of around 34 million SEK. Ordinary people spotted on the streets were used as models for the characters. The main character Roger is based on a chef who worked at a restaurant in Stockholm where the Atmo employees were regulars, and Nina was found in a make-up store. Vincent Gallo accepted his part as the lead voice actor after having seen 30 seconds of finished animation as well as hearing that German actor Udo Kier, of whom Gallo was a fan, already was attached to the project. After a story board had been developed, photographer Sesse Lind travelled around Europe and took pictures of needed locations in Stockholm, Berlin, Paris and Copenhagen. The photographs were edited in Photoshop and animated in Adobe After Effects under lead animator Isak Gjertsen. Animation was done in Trollhättan as the first production to use Film i Väst's newly started animation studio. The production took two years to finish.

Release
The film premiered on 2 September 2009 at the Venice Film Festival, opening up the festival's Critic's Week but shown out of competition.

Awards

References

External links
 The Art of Metropia
 
 
 

2009 films
2009 animated films
2009 computer-animated films
2009 drama films
2009 science fiction films
2000s thriller drama films
Animated drama films
Animated thriller films
Danish animated science fiction films
Films directed by Tarik Saleh
Norwegian animated science fiction films
Swedish animated speculative fiction films
Swedish thriller films
English-language Danish films
English-language Norwegian films
English-language Swedish films
Dystopian films
2000s English-language films
2000s Swedish films
Zentropa films
Adult animated films